Padworth Lock is a lock on the Kennet and Avon Canal, at Aldermaston Wharf in the civil parish of Padworth in the English county of Berkshire.

Padworth Lock was built between 1718 and 1723 under the supervision of the engineer John Hore of Newbury, and was originally a turf-sided lock.  The lock has a rise/fall of 5 ft 1 in (1.55 m)., and was totally rebuilt as a brick lock between 1982 and 1984. The canal is administered by the Canal & River Trust.

References

External links
Padworth Lock on www.tonycanalpics.co.uk

See also

Locks on the Kennet and Avon Canal

Locks on the Kennet and Avon Canal
Locks of Berkshire